The Beeswing Stakes was a Group 3 flat horse race in Great Britain open to thoroughbreds aged three years or older. It was run at Newcastle over a distance of 7 furlongs (1,408 metres), and it was scheduled to take place each year in late July.

History
The event was named after Beeswing, a successful 19th-century racehorse bred in Northumberland. It was established in 1977, and for a period it held Listed status. It was promoted to Group 3 level in 1986.

The Beeswing Stakes was last run in 1999. It was replaced the following year by a similar race, the Lennox Stakes at Goodwood.

Newcastle currently stages a 7-furlong handicap race called the Beeswing Handicap.

Records
Most successful horse:
 no horse won this race more than once

Leading jockey (2 wins):
 Pat Eddery – Kampala (1980), Great Commotion (1989)
 Tony Ives – Milk of the Barley (1981), Silly Steven (1982)
 Edward Hide – Beaudelaire (1983), Major Don (1984)
 Steve Cauthen – Hadeer (1986), Salse (1988)
 Willie Carson – Bold Russian (1991), Shahid (1995)
 Ray Cochrane – Casteddu (1992), Eurolink Thunder (1993)

Leading trainer (2 wins):
 Paul Cole – John de Coombe (1978), Sarab (1985)
 Richard Hannon – Silly Steven (1982), Savahra Sound (1990)
 John Dunlop – Eurolink Thunder (1993), Shahid (1995)

Winners

See also
 Horseracing in Great Britain
 List of British flat horse races

References
 Racing Post:
 , 
 pedigreequery.com – Beeswing Stakes – Newcastle.
 

Flat races in Great Britain
Newcastle Racecourse
Open mile category horse races
Recurring sporting events established in 1977
Discontinued horse races